Mount Welcome, also known as the John Franklin Reinhardt House, is a historic home located near Mariposa and Lowesville, Lincoln County, North Carolina.  It was built in 1885, and is a two-story double-pile weatherboarded frame dwelling.  It has a low hipped roof and incorporates a rear ell that was part of an earlier Federal / Greek Revival dwelling.

It was listed on the National Register of Historic Places in 1991.

References

Houses on the National Register of Historic Places in North Carolina
Federal architecture in North Carolina
Greek Revival houses in North Carolina
Houses completed in 1885
Houses in Lincoln County, North Carolina
National Register of Historic Places in Lincoln County, North Carolina